The USS Panay incident on December 12, 1937, was a Japanese bombing attack on the U.S. Navy river gunboat  and three Standard Oil Company tankers on the Yangtze River. They strafed survivors in the water. The boats were rescuing U.S. and Chinese civilians fleeing from Japanese invaders attacking Nanking (now spelled Nanjing), China. Japan and the United States were not at war at the time. Public reaction was mixed in the U.S., with the president weighing various diplomatic and military responses only to settle for an apology and compensation. The Japanese claimed that they did not see the U.S. flags painted on the deck of the gunboat. Tokyo officially apologized, and paid a cash indemnity. The settlement mollified some of the U.S. anger, and newspapers called the matter closed.

Background
A flat-bottomed craft built in Shanghai specifically for river duty, Panay served as part of the US Navy's Yangtze Patrol in the Asiatic Fleet, which was responsible for patrolling the Yangtze River to protect American lives and property in China.

After invading China in the summer of 1937, Japanese forces moved into Nanking (now known as Nanjing) in December, where they later committed the massacre in the city that resulted in the deaths of 300,000 civilians and prisoners of war. Panay evacuated the remaining Americans from the city on December 11, bringing the number of people aboard to five officers, 54 enlisted men, four US embassy staff, and 10 civilians, including Universal Newsreel cameraman Norman Alley, Movietone News’ Eric Mayell, the New York Times's Norman Soong, Collier's Weekly correspondent Jim Marshall, La Stampa correspondent Sandro Sandri and Corriere della Sera correspondent Luigi Barzini Jr.

Incident
While anchored upstream from Nanking, Panay and three Standard Oil tankers, Mei Ping, Mei An, and Mei Hsia, came under attack from Japanese naval aircraft. Panay was hit by two of the eighteen  bombs dropped by three Yokosuka B4Y Type-96 bombers and strafed by nine Nakajima A4N Type-95 fighters.

According to Lieutenant J.W. Geist, an officer aboard Panay, "the day before we told the Japanese army in the area who we were," and three U.S. flags were plainly visible on the ship. Planes also machine-gunned small boats taking the wounded ashore, and several additional survivors were wounded. The Times correspondent Colin MacDonald, who had also been aboard Panay, saw a Japanese army small boat machine-gun the Panay as it was sinking in spite of the American flag painted on the side of the ship. Since Japanese planes continued to circle overhead, survivors cowered knee deep in mud in a swamp. Panay'''s lifeboats were machine-gunned by Japanese fighter planes in the attack.

As a result of the attack, Panay sank; Storekeeper First Class Charles Lee Ensminger, Standard Oil tanker captain Carl H. Carlson and Italian reporter Sandro Sandri were killed, Coxswain Edgar C. Hulsebus died later that night. 43 sailors and five civilians were wounded.

The three Standard Oil tankers were also bombed and destroyed, and the captain of Mei An and many Chinese civilian passengers were killed. The vessels had been helping to evacuate the families of Standard Oil's employees and agents from Nanking during the Japanese attack on that city.

Two newsreel cameramen were aboard during the attack (Norman Alley of Universal News and Eric Mayell of Movietone News); they were able to film part of the attack and, after reaching shore, the sinking of the ship in the middle of the river. Earlier the same day, a Japanese shore battery had fired on Ladybird.

The survivors coped with near freezing nights in inadequate clothing and with no food. It took three days to move the sixteen wounded to the safety of several British and American ships.

Diplomacy
The aftermath of the Panay sinking was a nervous time for the American ambassador to Japan, Joseph C. Grew. Grew, whose experience in the foreign service spanned over 30 years, "remembered the Maine," the U.S. Navy ship that blew up in Havana Harbor in 1898. The sinking of Maine had propelled the U.S. into the Spanish–American War, and Grew hoped the sinking of Panay would not be a similar catalyst for the severance of diplomatic ties and war with Japan.

The Japanese government took full responsibility for sinking Panay but continued to maintain that the attack had been unintentional. Chief of Staff of Japanese naval forces in northern China, Vice Admiral Rokuzo Sugiyama, was assigned to make an apology. The formal apology reached Washington, D.C. on Christmas Eve.

Although Japanese officials maintained that their pilots never saw any American flags on Panay, a US Navy court of inquiry determined that several US flags were clearly visible on the vessel during the attacks. At the meeting held at the American embassy in Tokyo on December 23, Japanese officials maintained that one navy airplane had attacked a boat by machine gun for a short period of time and that Japanese army motor boats or launches had been attacking the Chinese steamers escaping upstream on the opposite bank. However, the Japanese navy insisted that the attack had been unintentional. The Japanese government paid an indemnity of $2,214,007.36 to the US on April 22, 1938, officially settling the Panay incident ($ in ).

Post-incident

Donations
Following the incident, Japanese individuals and organizations sent letters of apology and gifts of money to U.S. diplomatic offices and the U.S. Navy Department in Washington, D.C. This ranged from letters penned by schoolchildren to organized pools of donors.

The most prominent donor was the America-Japan Society, headed by Prince Tokugawa Iesato, which amassed ¥16,242.56 in Panay contributions from 7,749 people and 218 organizations.

In response to the donations, Secretary of State Cordell Hull stated that "neither the American Government nor any agency of it nor any of its nationals should receive sums of money thus offered or take direct benefit therefrom." However, Hull noted that since "a flat rejection of such offers would produce some misunderstanding of our general attitude and offend those Japanese who make such a gesture, the Department is of the opinion that some method should be found whereby Japanese who wish to give that type of expression to their feelings may do so."

The United States State Department expressed the desire that any necessary arrangements should be made promptly. Hull did not wish to keep the Japanese people waiting for a decision on what was to become of the money they donated. A prolonged delay could lead to misunderstanding, especially if a decision was reached months later to return the money to the donors.

A temporary solution was reached to allow only the American ambassador in Japan and the American ambassador in China to accept donations related to the Panay incident. Several American consulates were receiving money, including consulates at Nagoya, Kobe, Nagasaki and Osaka, in Japan; Taipei, Taiwan; Keijo (Seoul), Korea; Dairen, Manchuria; and São Paulo, Brazil. These contributions were eventually forwarded to the ambassador in Tokyo. Grew kept all money received related to the Panay incident in the embassy safe until the State Department could find a solution.

Despite this policy, a local newspaper in Nagasaki, the Nagasaki Minyu Shimbun, published stories about some Japanese donations to the American consulate in Nagasaki, including an excerpt from a letter attached to a schoolboy's donation. Arthur F. Tower, the American consul in Nagasaki, informed Ambassador Grew of the article, which had been published on January 7. Tower also informed Grew that a reporter of another newspaper—the Tokyo and Osaka Asahi Shimbun, had called on him on 23 December to discuss the Panay contributions. Towers reassured Grew that "this consulate has not sought to give publicity to the donations received or offered and has furnished information concerning them on two occasions only, when requested." However, the newspaper stories may nonetheless have increased contributions to the location.

A final solution to the donations was reached by creating the Japan-America Trust in the name of the Panay survivors and relatives of those who lost their lives. The trust would be used to care for the graves of American sailors buried in Japan, dating back to the graves of sailors involved in the Perry Expedition in 1853. The formation of the trust allowed the State Department to avoid returning donations or directly distributing them to the U.S. government or individuals. 

Awards
Servicemembers aboard the Panay were awarded the Navy Expeditionary Medal and China Service Medal. 

Fireman First Class John L. Hodge and Lieutenant Clark G. Grazier were presented with the Navy Cross for their actions during the Panay incident.  

The Navy Cross was also presented to two British naval officers, Vice Admiral Lewis Eyre Crabbe and Lieut. Commander Harry Barlow, for their assistance in recovering survivors from the USS Panay.

Responsibility for the attack
Modern historians believe that the attack may have been intentional. According to John Prados, Navy cryptographers had intercepted and decrypted traffic relating to the attacking planes which clearly indicated that they were under orders during the attack and that it had not been a mistake of any kind. This information was not released at the time because it would have revealed that the United States had broken Japanese Naval codes. Writer Nick Sparks believes that the chaos in Nanking created an opportunity for renegade factions within the Japanese army who wanted to force the U.S. into an active conflict so that the Japanese could once and for all drive the U.S. out of China.

Legacy

Fon Huffman, the last survivor of the incident, died in 2008. The last surviving Japanese pilot who participated in the attack was Kaname Harada, who died in 2016.

The episode has been cited by Philip K. Dick in his novel The Man in the High Castle, depicted in a collectible picture-card of the 1940s, in the series Horrors of War with the title "The sinking of the Panay."

The incident features in the novel A Winter in China by the British writer Douglas Galbraith. It is also described in the historical fiction novel Pearl Harbor by Newt Gingrich and William R. Forstchen.

The Panay incident is an important part of the background in Own Sela's thriller An Exchange of Eagles. In the book, the only son of Max Schroeder, a Military Intelligence Colonel, was killed on board the Panay. Schroeder nurses a deep grudge against President Roosevelt, whom he considers to have sent his son to die in vain. That makes Schroeder willing, in 1940, to contemplate assassinating Roosevelt in order to prevent American soldiers being sent to die in Europe.

The 2009 film John Rabe portrays a fictionalized version of the incident.

Matt Zullo's 2020 novel "The U.S Navy's On-the-Roof Gang, Vol. 1" carries the narrative of the Navy intercept operators in Hawaii who followed Japanese communications before and during the attack.

See also
 Japan–United States relations

References

Further reading
 Ashbaugh, William. "Relations with Japan." in A Companion to Franklin D. Roosevelt (2011) pp: 612+.
 LaFeber, Walter. The clash: a history of U.S.-Japan relations (1997) pp 196–198.  excerpt
 Konstam, Angus. Yangtze River Gunboats 1900–49 (Bloomsbury, 2012).
 Peifer, Douglas Carl. (2016). Choosing war: presidential decisions in the Maine, Lusitania, and Panay incidents. New York, NY: Oxford University Press.  ISBN 978-0190939601  online review
 Peifer, Douglas Carl (2018) . "Presidential Crisis Decision Making Following the Sinking of the Panay." International Journal of Naval History 14, no. 2/November .
 Perry, Hamilton Darby. The Panay Incident: Prelude to Pearl Harbor (1969).
 Roberts Jr, Frank N. "Climax of Isolationism, Countdown to World War." Naval History 26.6 (2012): 32+
 Schnurr, Jeremy. "'The Best Possible Time for War?' The USS Panay and American Far Eastern Policy During the Roosevelt Presidency" (MA thesis. University of Ottawa, 2012) online; bibliography pp 165–72
 Swanson, Harlan J. "The 'Panay' Incident: Prelude To Pearl Harbor." U.S. Naval Institute Proceedings (Dec 1967) 93#12 pp 26–37.
 Tolley, Kemp. Yangtze Patrol: The US Navy in China (Naval Institute Press, 2013).

External links
Castle Film – Bombing of USS Panay – USS Panay Sinking 
The New York Times - Search
(パネー号事件と日米関係)"The Panay incident and Japan-US relations", in US-Japan War Talks'', the Japan Center for Asian Historical Records Japan Center for Asian Historical Records 

History of Nanjing
USS Panay
International maritime incidents
United States Navy in the 20th century
1937 in China
1937 in Japan
1937 in the United States
Japan–United States relations
1937 in international relations
USS Panay
Maritime incidents in 1937
Conflicts in 1937
Second Sino-Japanese War
Riverine warfare
Articles containing video clips
December 1937 events